Philip Jordan is an Irish Gaelic footballer who plays for the Moy club and, formerly, the Tyrone county team.

Jordan was an important member of the Tyrone team who won their first three All-Ireland titles in 2003, 2005 and 2008. His consistent and energetic performances also earned him All-Star awards in 2003, 2005, 2008 and 2010.

There was controversy surrounding his participation in the Tyrone team leading up to the Championship in 2011, and he ruled himself out of matches in the National Football League with rumours circulating that he had announced his retirement. Towards the end of April, however, he pledged to commit to the team for the remainder of the year, explaining that he needed time to assess if he "had the hunger" to go for another season.
Jordan announced his retirement from intercounty football on 2 November 2011.

References

1980 births
Living people
Irish international rules football players
Tyrone inter-county Gaelic footballers
Winners of three All-Ireland medals (Gaelic football)